Leonard Oliver or Len Oliver may refer to:

 Leonard Oliver (cricketer) (1886–1948), English cricketer
 Len Oliver (footballer) (1905–67), English international footballer
 Len Oliver (soccer), U.S. soccer half back

See also
Leonard Olivier (born 1923), American bishop
Len Olivier (born 1986), South African rugby union player